The 2009 Puerto Rico Soccer League Playoffs is the second year the format has been used.  It is the championship of the Puerto Rico Soccer League.  The format is the same as the 2008 edition with the top 4 teams from the league playing in the Tournament.  The only significant change is that there will be a Home Leg and an Away Leg for the Semifinals and final.  These teams play in the Semi-finals with the winner of each match going on to the  Championship game.

2009 Puerto Rico Soccer League playoffs

Champions
 Bayamon FC

Bayamon FC now joins River Plate Ponce as qualificants to the 2010 CFU Club Championship.

References 

Puerto Rico Soccer League seasons
1
Puerto Rican
Puerto Rican